Another Side of Singles II is a compilation album that contains all the B-sides from singles released by Luna Sea from 1998 to 2000. It was released on March 6, 2002, reached number 30 on the Oricon Albums Chart, and charted for two weeks.

Track listing

References 

Luna Sea albums
2002 compilation albums